Thenzawl is a census town in Serchhip district in the Indian state of Mizoram. It is an important center for the traditional Mizo handloom industry. Thenzawl is 90 km (56 miles) from Aizawl, the capital of Mizoram.

History
Thenzawl was a dense forest with many wild animals until it was cultivated in 1961 and inhabited. Bengkhuaia Sailo established a village in 1863 in Thenzawl. Kamlova's son, Lalngurchhina was the last chief of Thenzawl. Due to the March 1966 Mizo National Front uprising, Thenzawl was a village where people were grouped together in 1968.

Geography
It has an average elevation of 783 metres (2568 feet).

Education
The College of Horticulture Thenzawl is located in Thenzawl.

The  Jawahar Navodaya Vidhyalaya JNV the first Educational Institution run by Central Government of India in Mizoram is located.

Currently, there are 2 higher, 6 High School, 8 Middle School, 8 Primary School in Thenzawl.

Tourism 
Tourist sites in the area include:
 Bengkhuaia Thlan  - the founder of Thenzawl Bengkhuaia invaded Alexandrapur in 1871 kidnapping Mary Winchester which brought about the British to Mizoram. He died around 1879.
 Vaibiak - the place from where they took back Mary Winchester.
 Tualvungi Thlan - There are two graves at Phulpui village in the Aizawl district of Mizoram India. It is said that, Zawlpala, Chief of Phulpui village, married the "legendary beauty", Talvungi of Thenzawl. Tualvungi was subsequently married to the chief of Rothai, Phuntiha. But, Talvungi could not forget Zawlpala, her previous husband. After many years when Zawlpala died, grief stricken Tualvungi came to Phulpui, dug a pit by the side of Zawlpala's grave and asked an old woman to kill her and bury her in the grave.
 Chawngchilhi Puk - a cave associated with a love story between a lady and a snake.
 Tuirihiau falls - a beautiful waterfall near Thenzawl, upstream of Vantawng fall.
 Thenzawl Deer Park - has 17 deers (11 female and 6 male) in natural environment.
 Thenzawl Golf Course and Resort { https://thenzawlgolfresort.com/ } -  Rated as one of the best all season Golf courses in the North East India, Thenzawl Golf Course & Resort offers one of the best Pay & Play facility that caters to all levels of ability. It is the first and only golf course funded by the Ministry of Tourism, Government of India. Designed by Graham Cooke and Associates, one of the top-ranked Canada based Golf Course architectural firm. The total site area is 105 acres and the play area is 75 acres - 18 Hole Golf Course with Sharing Fairway and automated sprinkler irrigation system by Rain Bird, USA. It is designed to have facilities of international standards. There are 30 Eco-Log Huts, Cafeteria, Open Air Food Court, Reception area and Waiting Lounge etc, all constructed with Siberian Pinewood and fully furnished with world class furniture and fixtures.

Thenzawl Golf Course & Resort is a Golf course with green philosophy in a peaceful surroundings and breathtaking views.

For Tour Guide - call 8794799789

Media
The media in Thenzawl includes, Print Media and Visual :

Newspapers
 Vantawng
 Ramlai Post
 Zawlbuk Aw
All the newspaper in Thenzawl are Tri-weekly newspaper.

Cable TV
 Thenzawl Cable Network
 TS-Vision

Demographics

As of the 2011 Census of India, Thenzawl had a population of 7529. Males constitute 49.8% of the population and females 50.2%. Female Sex Ratio is of 1007 against state average of 976. Moreover Child Sex Ratio in Thenzawl is around 915 compared to Mizoram state average of 970. And according to Serchhip Statistical Handbook 2018 Population of Thenzawl was 11060. Thenzawl has an average literacy rate of 98.1%, higher than the state average of 91.33%: male literacy is 98.07%, and female literacy is 98.23%. In Thenzawl, 13.58% of the population is under 6 years of age.

References

Cities and towns in Serchhip district